Horst Kube (1920–1976) was a German actor.

Selected filmography
 Ernst Thälmann - Führer seiner Klasse (1955)
 A Berlin Romance (1956)
 Der Fackelträger (1957)
 Schlösser und Katen (1957)
 Don't Forget My Little Traudel (1957)
 Zwei Mütter (1957)
 The Sailor's Song (1958)
 Sun Seekers (1958/1972)
 The Punch Bowl (1959)
 Special Mission (1959)
 Always on Duty (1960)
 No Trouble with Cleopatra (1960)
 The Sons of Great Bear (1966)
 Schwarze Panther (1966)
 The Banner of Krivoy Rog (1967)
 The Heathens of Kummerow (1967)
 Bread and Roses (1967)
 Spur des Falken (1968)
 Husaren in Berlin (1971)

External links
 

1920 births
1976 deaths
German male film actors
Male actors from Berlin
20th-century German male actors